This article is about the particular significance of the year 1948 to Wales and its people.

Incumbents

Archbishop of Wales – David Prosser, Bishop of St David's
Archdruid of the National Eisteddfod of Wales – Wil Ifan

Events
21 May – Hugh Dalton is appointed Chancellor of the Duchy of Lancaster.
24 June – Thomas Williams is created 1st Baron Williams of Ynyshir.
1 July – The National Museum of Wales opens the Welsh Folk Museum at St Fagans to the public, the first open-air museum in the UK (director: Iorwerth Peate).
19 October – Opening of the Hoover washing machine factory at Merthyr Tydfil.
December – Plas Machynlleth given to the people of the town.
Aneurin Bevan is instrumental in the passing of the Local Government Act and National Assistance Act.
Ness Edwards joins the Privy Council.
Creation of the Welsh Joint Education Committee.
Beginning of nylon manufacture at Pontypool.
Jim Griffiths becomes Chairman of the Labour Party.
The Council for Wales and Monmouthshire is established as an advisory body.
A residential Welsh-medium preparatory school for boys is founded at Llanilar in Cardiganshire.
Elsie Joan Lewis is appointed as the first policewoman in Wales in modern times, in Glamorgan.
Physicist Rhisiart Morgan Davies publishes the results of his work on stress waves.

Arts and literature
Kingsley Amis becomes a lecturer at the University of Wales, Swansea.

Awards

National Eisteddfod of Wales (held in Bridgend)
National Eisteddfod of Wales: Chair – D. Emrys James,
National Eisteddfod of Wales: Crown – Euros Bowen, "O'r Dwyrain"
National Eisteddfod of Wales: Prose Medal – Robert Ivor Parry

New books

English language
Sir Alfred Thomas Davies – The Lloyd George I Knew
Jack Jones – Some Trust in Chariots

Welsh language
Ambrose Bebb – Gadael tir
Aneirin Talfan Davies – Eliot, Pwshcin, Poe
William Eames & Megan Ellis – Melin y Ddôl
Griffith Wynne Griffith – Ffynnon Bethlehem
Robert David Griffith – Hanes Canu Cynulleidfaol Cymru
Isaac Daniel Hooson – Y Gwin a Cherddi Eraill
David James Jones (Gwenallt) – Bywyd a Gwaith Islwyn
Griffith John Williams – Traddodiad Llenyddol Morgannwg

New drama
Saunders Lewis – Blodeuwedd

Music
Arwel Hughes – String Quartet No. 1
David Wynne – Sonata for violin and piano

Film
Glynis Johns stars in Miranda.
Hugh Griffith appears in London Belongs to Me
Wandering Through Wales

Broadcasting
1 March – Welsh Rarebit, previously broadcast during the Second World War, begins its run on the BBC Light Programme.

Sport
Athletics – Tom Richards finishes second in the marathon at the London Olympics, becoming the first Welshman to win an individual athletics medal at the Olympics.
Equestrianism
Harry Llewellyn is part of the team winning a bronze medal at the Olympic Games in London.
The only Welsh Grand National to be run at Caerleon is won by Bora's Cottage.
Rugby Union
21 February – France beats Wales 3–11 at the St Helen's Ground in Swansea.

Births
22 January – Roger Williams, politician
1 March – Karl Johnson, actor
4 March – Shakin' Stevens, singer
1 April
Dai Davies, footballer (d. 2021)
Peter Law, politician (d. 2006)
J. J. Williams, Wales international rugby union player (d. 2020)
2 April – Tommy David, Wales international rugby union and league player
14 May – Albert Alan Owen, composer
18 May – Keith Jarrett, rugby player
26 May (in London) – Jenny Randerson, politician
4 June (in Glasgow) – Jeff Cuthbert, politician
14 June – Ffred Ffransis, political activist
16 June – Elan Closs Stephens, educator and broadcasting executive
2 August – Andy Fairweather-Low, musician
9 August – Jackie Lawrence, politician
12 September (in Jamaica) – Neville Meade, heavyweight boxer (d. 2010)
24 October – Phil Bennett, rugby player (d. 2022)
14 November (in London) – Charles III (Prince of Wales, 1958–2022)
25 November – Paul Murphy, politician
26 December – Steve Curtis, boxer (d. 1994)
28 December – Terry Morgan, civil engineer
date unknown
Alan Llwyd, poet
Manon Rhys, writer

Deaths
12 January – Wilfred Bailey, 3rd Baron Glanusk, 56
19 January – Frederick Phillips, hockey player, 63
11 February – Evan Davies, politician in Australia, 58
21 February – Tom Pook, Wales international rugby union player, 78
8 March – Charlie Thomas, Wales international rugby player
9 April – John Daniel Davies, 74
25 April – Arthur Boucher, Wales international rugby union player, 77
30 April – David Daniel, Wales international rugby union player, 77
17 May – David Evans, organist and composer, 74
22 May – David Delta Evans (Dewi Hiraddug), journalist, author, and Unitarian minister, 82
9 June – Len Trump, Wales international rugby player, 61
18 July – John Tywi Jones, Baptist minister and journalist, 78
31 July – Herbert Millingchamp Vaughan, historian, 78
20 August – David John de Lloyd, composer, 65
28 August – Charles Evans Hughes, American politician of Welsh descent, 86
4 October – Arthur Whitten Brown, British aviator, in Swansea, 62
18 October – Isaac Daniel Hooson, poet, 68
17 November – B. B. Mann, Wales international rugby union player, 90

References

See also
1948 in Northern Ireland

 
Wales